Grimstad may refer to:

Places

Norway
Grimstad, a municipality in Aust-Agder county
Grimstad (town), a town in Grimstad municipality in Aust-Agder county
Grimstad Church, a church in the town of Grimstad in Aust-Agder county
Grimstad, Østfold, a village in Råde municipality in Østfold county

United States
Grimstad Township, Roseau County, Minnesota, a township in Minnesota

People
Grimstad (surname), a list of people with the surname of Grimstad

Other
Grimstad Bible School, a Bible school in Grimstad, Norway